Chhedi Ka Pura, Phulpur, Allahabad is a small village in Uttar Pradesh. It is also known as Saodeeh.

References

Villages in Allahabad district